KOKR 96.7 FM is a radio station licensed to Newport, Arkansas.  The station broadcasts a country music format and is owned by Newport Broadcasting Company.

References

External links
KOKR's official website

OKR
Country radio stations in the United States
Radio stations established in 1967
1967 establishments in Arkansas